The Brave One is a 2007 psychological thriller film directed by Neil Jordan and written by Roderick Taylor, Bruce A. Taylor and Cynthia Mort. The film stars Jodie Foster as Erica Bain, a New York City radio host whose partner is beaten to death by criminals. Terrified for her safety, she buys a pistol and undergoes a personality transformation, becoming a vigilante. Detective Sean Mercer (Terrence Howard) investigates the vigilante shootings, which lead him closer and closer to Bain. The film features Naveen Andrews, Nicky Katt, Zoë Kravitz, Mary Steenburgen and Luis Da Silva in supporting roles.
 
A loose remake of Death Wish, The Brave One was released in the United States on September 14, 2007. The film received mixed reviews from critics who acclaimed Foster's performance but criticized its execution. It was a box office disappointment grossing $69 million worldwide. At the 65th Golden Globe Awards, Foster received a nomination for Best Actress Motion Picture in a Drama.

Plot
Radio host Erica Bain and her fiancé Dr. David Kirmani are viciously attacked by three men while walking their dog in Central Park; the men film the assault on their phones, and take Erica's engagement ring and her dog. David dies from his injuries and Erica finds herself unable to continue her life as normal.

Traumatized and living in fear, she attempts to purchase a gun but is denied a sale due to having no gun license. A nearby black market gun dealer overhears her desperation for protection and offers to sell her a Kahr K9 pistol for $1000. Unwilling to wait 30 days for a legal firearm, Erica buys the handgun from him.

One evening while Erica is at a convenience store, a man enters and shoots the store's cashier to death. Hearing Erica's cell phone ring, the man stalks her in the aisles before she kills him with three shots. Another night on a subway car, two men harass the passengers, all of whom leave except Erica. The men then threaten her with a knife; she kills them both. Later on, Erica attempts to save a prostitute by threatening her pimp. When he attempts to run them down with his car, Erica shoots him in the head, causing his car to run over the prostitute. She is injured but lives.

Fuelled by rage and a need for vengeance, Erica begins to track down the three men who killed David. Meanwhile, she strikes up a friendship with Detective Sean Mercer, who is investigating the vigilante killings around the city. The detective shares the name of a vicious criminal he is unable to prosecute. When the criminal is found dead near a parking garage, Detective Mercer inspects the area and begins to suspect Erica.

Mercer takes Erica with him to interview the prostitute she had saved, but the prostitute does not let on that she recognizes Erica.

Mercer privately indicates to Erica that he suspects her but is struggling with what to do about it.

The police ask Erica to identify one of the suspects in her attack; though she recognizes the assailant, she does not identify him. She is later informed the police have found her engagement ring at a pawn shop, and goes there to get a name, address and phone number of who sold it to them. She tracks down one of her attacker's ex-girlfriends. The woman is initially too frightened to reveal her boyfriend's whereabouts, but she later sends Erica the video recording of her attack and his address. Erica forwards the video onto Mercer.

Erica tracks down all three men, and confronts and kills two of them before freeing her dog. She struggles with the third attacker who gains the upper hand just as Mercer arrives. As Mercer attempts to arrest the attacker, Erica retrieves her weapon and prepares to execute him. Mercer persuades Erica to lower her gun, but after looking into her pleading eyes, hands her his own gun to use instead, and Erica shoots the attacker dead. Mercer then insists that Erica wound him with her gun, which she does, allowing them to frame her attackers for the vigilante killings. Mercer then places her gun in the last attacker's hand and Erica leaves. She walks through Central Park joined by her dog.

Cast

Release

Box office
In its opening weekend in the United States and Canada, the film was #1 at the box office, grossing $13,471,488 in 2,755 theaters. As of December 29, 2007, the film has grossed $69,787,394 worldwide—$36,793,804 in the United States and Canada and $32,993,590 in other territories.

Critical reception
The Brave One received mixed reviews from critics. Rotten Tomatoes gives it a score of 43% based on 183 reviews. The site's consensus states: "Magnetic by between Jodie Foster and Terrence Howard can't quite compensate for The Brave Ones problematic and unconvincing eye-for-an-eye moral." On Metacritic, the film had an average score of 56%, based on 33 reviews.

Roger Ebert of the Chicago Sun-Times gave the film three and a half out of four stars, saying Foster and Howard "are perfectly modulated in the kinds of scenes difficult for actors to play, where they both know more than they're saying, and they both know it."

Awards and nominations

Foster was nominated for Best Performance by an Actress in a Motion Picture – Drama at the 65th Golden Globe Awards.

See also
 Bernhard Goetz
 Death Wish
 Death Wish (1974 film) · cfr. talk
 Eye for an Eye
 Taxi Driver

References

External links

 
 
 
 
 DVD Talk on The Brave One

2007 films
2007 crime drama films
2007 psychological thriller films
2000s vigilante films
American crime drama films
Australian crime drama films
2000s English-language films
Films scored by Dario Marianelli
Films about radio people
American films about revenge
Films directed by Neil Jordan
Films produced by Joel Silver
Films set in New York City
Girls with guns films
Silver Pictures films
American vigilante films
Village Roadshow Pictures films
Warner Bros. films
Films about post-traumatic stress disorder
2000s American films